Jane Dieulafoy (29 June 1851 – 25 May 1916) was a French archaeologist, explorer, novelist, feminist and journalist. She was the wife of Marcel-Auguste Dieulafoy. She and her husband excavated the Ancient Persian city of Susa and made various discoveries some of which are displayed in the Louvre museum.

Career
Jane Dieulafoy was born Jeanne Henriette Magre to a wealthy family of bourgeoisie merchants in Toulouse, France. She studied at the Couvent de l’Assomption d’Auteuil in a suburb of Paris from 1862 to 1870. She married Marcel Dieulafoy in May 1870, at the age of 19. That same year, the Franco-Prussian War began. Marcel volunteered, and was sent to the front. Jane accompanied him, wearing a soldier's uniform and fighting by his side.

With the end of the war, Marcel was employed by the Midi railways, but during the next ten years the Dieulafoys would travel in Egypt and Morocco for archaeological and exploration work. Jane did not keep a record of these journeys. Marcel became increasingly interested in the relationship between Oriental and Western architecture, and in 1879, decided to devote himself to archaeology.

The Dieulafoys first visited Persia in 1881, and would return twice after that. The first journey to Persia was by freighter from Marseilles to Constantinople, by a Russian boat to Poti on the east coast of the Black Sea, and then across the Caucasus, and via Azerbaijan to Tabriz. From there they travelled widely through Persia, to Tehran, Esfahan, and Shiraz. Jane Dieulafoy documented the pair's explorations in photographs, illustrations, and writing. She took daily notes during her travels, which were later published in two volumes.

At Susa, the couple found numerous artifacts and friezes, several of which were shipped back to France. One such find is the famous Lion Frieze on display at the Louvre. Two rooms in the museum contain artefacts brought back by the Dieulafoy missions. For her contributions, the French government conferred upon her the title of Chevalier of the Legion of Honor in 1886. 
The transfer of the found objects to France caused considerable damage to the findings of Iranian archaeological excavations. Jane Dieulafoy says in her memoir about the Apadana Palace in Susa:

After their journeys in Persia, Dieulafoy and her husband spent time traveling in Spain and Morocco between 1888 and 1914. She also wrote two novels: Her first was Parysatis, in 1890, set in ancient Susa. It  was later adapted into an opera by Camille Saint-Saëns. Her second, Déchéance, was published in 1897. Marcel volunteered to go to Rabat, Morocco during the First World War, and Jane accompanied him. 

While in Morocco, her health began to decline. She contracted amoebic dysentery and was forced to return to France where she died in Pompertuzat in 1916. The childless couple left their home at 12, rue Chardin in Paris to the French Red Cross who continue to operate an office from the building to this day.

Cross-dressing

During her travels abroad, Jane Dieulafoy preferred to dress in men's clothing and to wear her hair short, because it was otherwise difficult for a woman to travel freely in a Muslim country. She had also dressed as a man when she fought alongside Marcel Dieulafoy during the Franco-Prussian war and she kept dressing in men's clothing when she came back in France. This was against the law in France at the time, but when she returned from the Middle East she received special "permission de travestissement" from the prefect of police. Of her cross-dressing Dieulafoy wrote "I only do this to save time. I buy ready-made suits and I can use the time saved this way to do more work". She includes many characters who cross-dress in her fiction, including her novels Volontaire and Frère Pélage.

Dieulafoy considered herself an equal to her husband, but was also fiercely loyal to him. She was opposed to the idea of divorce, believing it degraded women. During the First World War, she petitioned for allowing women a greater role in the military. She was a member of the jury of the prix Femina literary prize from its creation in 1904 until her death.

Bibliography
Major published works:

References

Further reading
Adams, Amanda,  Ladies of the Field: Early Women Archaeologists and Their Search for Adventure, Douglas & McIntyre, 
Rossiter, Heather,  Sweet Boy Dear Wife: Jane Dieulafoy in Persia 1881-1886, Wakefield Press,

External links

 
 

1851 births
1916 deaths
Writers from Toulouse
Explorers of Asia
Archaeologists from Toulouse
French Iranologists
French women archaeologists
Women travel writers
19th-century archaeologists
19th-century French novelists
20th-century French writers
19th-century French women writers
20th-century French women writers
French travel writers
French explorers
Female explorers
French women novelists
French military personnel of the Franco-Prussian War
Chevaliers of the Légion d'honneur
French women historians